Kristbjörg Kjeld (born 18 June 1935) is an Icelandic actress. She appeared in more than thirty films since 1962. Kjeld won the 2010 Edda Award for Best Leading Actress for her performance as Mamma Gógó in Mamma Gógó.

Selected filmography

References

External links 

1935 births
Living people
Icelandic film actresses